The Action Party is a political party in Morocco. It is currently led by Mohammed El Idrissi.

History and profile
The party was founded in 1974. In the parliamentary election, held on 7 September 2007, the party did not win any seats.
In the 2011 parliamentary election, the PA won 1 seat.

References

1974 establishments in Morocco
Political parties established in 1974
Political parties in Morocco
Socialist parties in Morocco